The Namibian Stock Exchange (NSX) is the only stock exchange in Namibia. Based in Windhoek, it is one of the largest stock exchanges on the African continent. It has a partnership with JSE in neighbouring South Africa. The NSX is only open on weekdays, and trades continuously from 09:00 to 17:00 (WAT), excluding public holidays.

The stock exchange operates under a license from the Namibian non banking financial regulator NAMFISA. The stock exchange is regulated by the Stock Exchanges Control Act (1985 and 1992).

History 
The first stock exchange in Namibia was founded in Lüderitz (previously known as the Lüderitz Stock Exchange). It opened at the start of the 1900s as a result of the diamond rush, which brought hundreds of prospectors to the desert, who then built towns. After a few years, the old exchange closed when the diamond rush ended and there was no more business.

Relaunch 

The idea of a second Namibian Stock Exchange was started as people planned to build an independent economy ahead of the 1990 national independence from South African occupation. The government gave the idea the go ahead and full legislative support, while funding came from 36 leading Namibian businesses, representing the full cross-section of interested parties in developing capital markets, who became founder members by donating N$10,000 each to act as start-up capital for the first three years of the exchange. The official launch, by then Finance Minister Gert Hanekom, was on September 30, 1992, and trading began the next day in the shares of Nictus, a local firm already listed in Johannesburg, and on that day dual-listed in Namibia. At that stage there was only one stockbroker, who also acted as consultant. Since then, five more stockbrokers have joined and twice a year the NSX sets examinations for new stockbrokers.

Listed companies 
, there are 44 companies listed on the stock exchange. In addition, there are 33 companies with more than one listing, and 24 companies also listed on the JSE in South Africa. The Namibian Stock Exchange has ten local listings.

References

External links 

Namibian Stock Exchange
NSE Profile
About Namibia

1992 establishments in Namibia
Buildings and structures in Windhoek
Companies based in Windhoek
Economy of Namibia
Stock exchanges in Africa